Kim Ok-soon (Korean: 김옥순; born 2 February 1949) is a former North Korean speed skater. She represented her nation between 1968 and 1972 at international competitions.

Kim Ok-soon participated at the World Allround Speed Skating Championships for Women in 1968, finishing 25th overall. In April 1970 she started in three events at the 1970 Winter Universiade, with her best result in the 1000m finishing 4th. She competed in the women's 3000 metres at the 1972 Winter Olympics.

Records

Personal records

References

1949 births
Living people
North Korean female speed skaters
Olympic speed skaters of North Korea
Speed skaters at the 1972 Winter Olympics
Place of birth missing (living people)